FreePBX is a web-based open-source graphical user interface (GUI) that manages Asterisk, a voice over IP and telephony server.

FreePBX is licensed under the GNU General Public License version 3. It is a component of the FreePBX Distro, which is an independently maintained Linux system derived from the source code of the CentOS distribution, having Asterisk pre-installed. It is also included in various third-party distributions such as The FreePBX Distro and AsteriskNow.

FreePBX was acquired by Schmooze.com in early 2013. That firm was, in turn, taken over by Sangoma Technologies Corporation on Jan 2, 2015.

FreePBX is a community of developers and contributors who devote their work to making complicated phone system software easy to use and functional.

Installation 
FreePBX can be installed as standalone software, or as part of a pre-configured FreePBX Distro that includes the operating system, the Asterisk PBX, FreePBX, and assorted dependencies:

FreePBX is included in open source distributions such as The Official FreePBX Distro, AsteriskNOW, Elastix and RasPBX

Development 
FreePBX is written in PHP and JavaScript. The first FreePBX release, version 0.2 (November 28, 2004), was named the Asterisk Management Portal (AMP). The project was renamed to FreePBX for trademark reasons, as Asterisk is a registered trademark of the Digium corporation (which is now also a subsidiary of Sangoma Technologies Corporation).

New releases of Asterisk have been accommodated by various updates to FreePBX. Updates have included new menus and support for additional capabilities such as voice mail, calling queues, fax, multiple languages, DAHDI and a local user directory.

Current versions are:
 FreePBX 2.11 –  Completed 2013-05-14- – Adds support for Asterisk 11, Destination popOvers, Module Admin Security Auditing, Chan Motif Module, WebRTC User Control Panel
 FreePBX 12 –  Previous Release 2014-06-23- – Adds support for Asterisk 12&13, New User Control Panel, Module Admin version control, PJSIP Support
FreePBX 13 - Previous Stable - adds responsive GUI, support for Asterisk 13, Call Event Logging CEL and reporting, fwconsole CLI system management, Enhanced Bulk User Management, expanded localization support for audio and sound files, and a new global search option.
FreePBX 14 - Previous Stable
FreePBX 15 - Stable Adds a new REST and GraphQL API. Adds a rebuilt backup module and a new Filestore module.

FreePBX supports numerous hardware manufacturers, including Aastra Technologies, Algo, AND, AudioCodes, Cisco Systems, Cyberdata, Digium, Grandstream, Mitel, Nortel, Panasonic, Polycom, Sangoma, Snom, Xorcom, and Yealink. FreePBX developers estimate the distro has been  deployed in millions of active PBX systems in over 220 countries and territories.

References

External links 
 

 
Free VoIP software
Unified communications
Software using the GNU AGPL license
Software using the GPL license